Keesara also known as  Kesarigiri ancient name, is a major village and mandal headquarters in the Medchal-Malkajgiri district of the Indian state of Telangana. It is the mandal and divisional headquarters of Keesara mandal in Keesara revenue division and also outer suburb of Hyderabad, also a part of Hyderabad Metropolitan Region. It's located near Outer Ring Road, Hyderabad. It is in the center of Shamirpet - Keesara - Ghatkesar, ECIL - Keesara - Bommalaramaram - M.Turkapalli Routes . It also a part of Hyderabad Metropolitan Development Authority.

Administration 
This Gram Panchayat has Vannigudem Hamlet, Keesaragutta (Uninhabited Anicent village) with Keesara village, comes under Keesara Revenue Village.

Transportation
No railway connections are available in Keesara. TSRTC buses are available from Hyderabad (Secunderabad railway station) and other suburbs like Ghatkesar, Bhongir, Shamirpet, Yadagirigutta.

Important places
 Collectorate Office at Outer Ring road.
 Keesara Police station.
 Keesaragutta Temple.

References

Villages in Medchal–Malkajgiri district